Nutrition in Clinical Practice is a peer-reviewed medical journal that covers the scientific basis and clinical application of nutrition and nutrition support research. The journal was established in 1986 with Philip Schneider as the founding editor. The current editor-in-chief is Jeanette M. Hasse. It is an official publication of the American Society for Parenteral and Enteral Nutrition and is published by Wiley.

Abstracting and indexing 
The journal is indexed and abstracted in the following bibliographic databases:

According to the Journal Citation Reports, its 2020 impact factor is 3.080, ranking it 59 out of 89 journals in the category "Nutrition & Dietetics".

Editors                      
 Philip Schneider, 1986-1995
 Peggi Guenter, 1996-2000
 Charles W. Van Way III, 2003-2007 
 Sarah Miller, 2003
 Jeanette M. Hasse, 2003-present

References

External links 
 
 American Society for Parenteral and Enteral Nutrition
Wiley (publisher) academic journals
English-language journals
Bimonthly journals
Publications established in 1986
Nutrition and dietetics journals